The Urn of Life (modeled 1898-1900, carved 1905-1906) is an allegorical sculpture by George Grey Barnard in the collection of the Carnegie Museum of Art in Pittsburgh, Pennsylvania, United States.

Following years in storage, the museum thoroughly cleaned the urn and returned it to public exhibition in 2012.

History
Anton Seidl, the 47-year-old Hungarian-born musical director of the New York Philharmonic and conductor of the Metropolitan Opera, died unexpectedly in 1898. A group of Seidl's friends and colleagues commissioned Barnard to create a burial urn to hold Seidl's ashes. 

Barnard had made a spectacular debut at the 1894 Paris Salon, and his Struggle of the Two Natures in Man had entered the collection of the Metropolitan Museum of Art in 1896. In 1891, he had modeled a  chimneypiece decorated with high bas-relief figure groups illustrating Scandinavian myths. For the new commission, he modeled a series of clay sketches on the themes of life, death and religion, and incorporated these into what became The Urn of Life. Seidl's family initially declined the proposed urn because of its heroic size.

Barnard carved The Urn of Life in marble, 1905–1906. He developed five of its figure groups—The Mystery of Life, The Visitation, The Birth, Solitude, Musician Dying—into independent works. 

The Urn of Life, Musician Dying, The Visitation, and The Birth were shown in the 1908 one-man exhibition of Barnard's work, at the Museum of Fine Arts, Boston. 

The Mystery of Life, Musician Dying, The Birth, and Solitude were exhibited at the 1913 Armory Show in New York City, along with The Prodigal Son, from Barnard's Pennsylvania State Capitol sculpture groups. 

Barnard reworked the urn in 1918, about the time of America's entry into World War I. He sold the unfinished sculpture to the Carnegie Museum of Art in 1919.

Barnard later wrote that his work on The Urn of Life influenced the choices he made for the Pennsylvania State Capitol sculpture groups.

Figure groups
Nineteen figures in seven groups encircle The Urn of Life, depicting life events and allegories. Barnard's descriptions of the figure groups come from his papers at the Archives of American Art, Smithsonian Institution:
The Mystery of Life. The shrouded figure of Mystery holds an egg-shaped urn, while flanked by a man holding a tool and a woman holding flowers.
The End of Life. As a grieving couple surveys the recumbent body of an old man, an angel appears.
Musician Dying (also called The Dying Poet). A collapsed young man comforted by a female figure.
The Birth (also called Family Group).
Labor and Love. A standing woman rests her hand on the head of a kneeling and toiling man.
Solitude. Depicts the estrangement of Adam and Eve after the Fall of Man—"They are man and woman, together yet alone, divided by that same barrier that even the closest of earthly love is powerless to break down entirely."
The Visitation. A kneeling man kisses the brow of a recumbent woman who has just given birth, while a guardian angel holds their newborn babe. Above them is a sculptor, "hewing out [the angel's] wing from the solid rock,—which is the only way we ever get our wings!"

Marble versions of Solitude are at the Taft Museum of Art in Cincinnati, Ohio; Vassar College in Poughkeepsie, New York; and the Chrysler Museum of Art in Norfolk, Virginia. A marble version of The Mystery of Life is at the Smithsonian American Art Museum in Washington, D.C. Marble versions of The Birth, The Visitation, and Musician Dying were shown in the 1963 centenary exhibition of Barnard's work, but are currently unlocated.

Burial urn
Following the rejection of a heroic size urn, Barnard carved a smaller and simplified version for Seidl's widow:
Urn for Siedl's Ashes: A memorial subscribed for by his friends on view at Steinways.A memorial urn to contain the ashes of Anton Seidl has been placed, temporarily, in the Steinway Building in East Fourteenth street, and Thursday [December 27, 1905] there was a private viewof the urn for subscribers.Former associates and friends of Herr Seidl may see it by applying to Steinway & Sons untilJanuary 6. The urn was designed and carved by George Grey Barnard. It bears sculpturedfigures of a dying youth with a harp and of Mystery bearing a small urn of Life.
The egg-shaped burial urn is carved from white marble, and features two figure groups—Musician Dying and The Mystery of Life. It holds the ashes of Anton and Auguste Seidl, and is housed in the Fresh Pond Crematory and Columbarium in Queens, New York City.

Notes

References

1906 sculptures
Sculptures by George Grey Barnard
Marble sculptures in Pennsylvania
Nude sculptures in Pennsylvania
Carnegie Museum of Art